Amar Depois de Amar (English: Love after Loving) is a Portuguese telenovela broadcast and produced by TVI. The telenovela premiered on June 17, 2019 and ended on September 13, 2019.

Plot 
«Amar Depois de Amar» tells the story of four great passions and the crime they unleash between the Macedo family and the Oliveira family.

Raquel Macedo (Maria João Pinho) and Gonçalo Macedo (Pedro Lima) are happy, have been married for 20 years and have two twin sons: Frederico (Gonçalo Norton) and Alice (Catarina Rebelo). Gonçalo is a majority partner in an oyster nursery company and a fish and seafood distribution factory. Rich heir, disputes control of the company with his cousin and minority partner, André, who blackmails and swindles him.

Gonçalo's mother, Matilde (Helena Isabel), always disregarded her daughter-in-law for her lightness of mind and carelessness. When Gonçalo has an accident that puts him in a coma, Matilde will do his best to "get rid of" her and to take control of the family business.

Marina Oliveira (Dina Félix da Costa) and Augusto Oliveira (Filipe Vargas), also married for 20 years, have two teenage children: Catarina (Carolina Frias) and Nicolau (Bernardo Lobo Faria). In keeping with the family harmony that they both cherish, the couple have been trying to forget about their professional frustrations: Augusto is a contractor but would like to be a PJ inspector, as he had been before, and Marina wanted to be a ballroom dancer - where she had a future, above all, as a tango dancer - an activity she abandoned because of her children. She will still have a third child “out of time”, which will prevent her from starting over at a later age.

The two couples know each other and, initially against the wishes of Augusto, whom Gonçalo's wealth bothers, and Gonçalo, whom the intimacy between Raquel and Marina bothers, become inseparable friends. Raquel finds in Marina her missing friend, but Gonçalo will also find in her an overwhelming and corresponding passion.

The love between the two, which they both believe to be an absolute secret, will come to light when they suffer an attack and a car accident. Marina dies and Gonçalo is in a coma.

A police investigation is born here that leads us to meet almost every character. As it turns out, they could all have reason to have committed this crime because, after all, they all knew more about that passion than they let on - Alice and Nicholas; Xavier (Pompeu José), compadre of Augustus; Aurora (Sofia Nicholson), factory employee, and especially André (Nuno Pardal), Gonçalo's sinister cousin.

Judiciary Police inspector Miguel Meireles (Pedro Teixeira) will play a leading role in this investigation in which he invests everything, also, to try to cheer up his wife, Laura Meireles (Fernanda Serrano) who, above all , wants to be a mother without success, and is dedicated to writing a new crime-inspired fiction that hits Marina and Gonçalo. Laura's involvement in this inquiry will go far beyond what is advisable and thus endanger her life and put her marriage at risk.

Cast

Main 
 Maria João Pinho - Raquel Macedo
 Pedro Lima - Gonçalo Macedo
 Filipe Vargas - Augusto Oliveira
 Dina Félix da Costa - Marina Oliveira
 Fernanda Serrano - Laura Meireles
 Pedro Teixeira - Miguel Meireles

Secondary
 Helena Isabel - Matilde Macedo
 Catarina Rebelo - Alice Macedo
 Gonçalo Norton - Frederico Macedo
 Nuno Pardal - André Macedo
 Carolina Frias - Catarina Oliveira
 Bernardo Lobo Faria - Nicolau Oliveira
 Ana Varela - Sara Sousa
 Teresa Faria - Júlia Campos
 Diogo Lopes - João Paulo Nunes
 Sofia Nicholson - Aurora Justo
 Dinarte Branco - Vicente Barrigoto
 Isabel Figueira - Luísa Barrigoto
 Teresa Tavares - Aline Matias
 Luís Esparteiro - António Gouveia
 Pedro Almendra - Ângelo Severino
 Tomás Alves - Kevin Silva
 João Lagarto - Joaquim Zorra
 Rodrigo Trindade - Sebastião Gaio
 Pompeu José - José Emanuel Xavier
 João Didelet - Joaquim José «Quim Zé» Rodrigues
 Vicente Wallenstein - Manuel «Mané» António dos Santos

References

External links

Portuguese telenovelas
Televisão Independente telenovelas
2019 Portuguese television series debuts
2019 Portuguese television series endings
2019 telenovelas
Portuguese-language telenovelas
Portuguese television series based on non-Portuguese television series
Non-Argentine television series based on Argentine television series